Schönhuber is a German surname. Notable people with the surname include:

 Franz Schönhuber (1923–2005), German journalist, politician, and author
Manuel Schönhuber (born 1991), German footballer

German-language surnames